Rogozen is a village in Northwestern Bulgaria. It is located in Hayredin Municipality, Vratsa Province.

Rogozen is famous for its Rogozen treasure.

Notabilities

Jordan Ganchovski, a now US-based Bulgarian writer, poet, literary critic and playwright, was born in Rogozen.

See also
List of villages in Vratsa Province

Villages in Vratsa Province